State Route 131 (SR 131) is a  long east–west state highway in the southwestern quadrant of the U.S. state of Ohio. The western terminus of SR 131 is at a signalized intersection with U.S. Route 50 (US 50) in the eastern Cincinnati suburb of Milford.

Route description
The path of SR 131 takes it through northern Clermont County, northwestern Brown County and western Highland County.  There are no segments of SR 131 that are included within the National Highway System (NHS), a network of highways deemed to be most important for the economy, mobility and defense of the country.

History
The SR 131 designation was applied in 1923.  Originally, the highway was routed along its present alignment from its current western terminus in Milford to its junction with US 50, at the time designated as SR 26, southwest of Fayetteville.  In 1946, SR 131 was extended east along its current alignment to its present eastern terminus at SR 138 southwest of Hillsboro, utilizing a previously un-numbered roadway between its previous eastern terminus and SR 134, and the entirety of what was SR 780 between SR 134 and SR 138.

Major intersections

References

131
131
131
131